University College of Commerce & Business Management, is a business school in Hyderabad, Telangana. It is a constituent college of Osmania University and was established in 1962. It is divided into the departments of Business Management and Commerce.

Rankings and Ratings
The school was ranked 46th among business management schools in India by Outlook Magazine in 2009 and ranked 29th by India Today.

See also

 List of business schools in Hyderabad, India

References

External links
Official Website
Osmania University Alumni Association

1962 establishments in Andhra Pradesh
Colleges affiliated to Osmania University
Business schools in Hyderabad, India
Educational institutions established in 1962